The Marietta Historic District is a historic district in Marietta, Ohio, United States that is listed on the National Register of Historic Places.  Among the buildings in the district are ones dating back to 1788, the year in which Marietta was founded as the first white settlement in what is now Ohio.  Among its most significant buildings are the Rufus Putnam House and the Ohio Company Land Office, which are also separately listed on the Register.

When the district was added to the Register in 1974, it encompassed an area roughly bounded by the Muskingum and Ohio Rivers and Warren, Third, Fifth, and Sixth Streets. In 2001, some of its original boundaries were slightly reduced, but it was also expanded greatly to include an area roughly bounded by Marion, Montgomery, Ohio, Greene, Butler, and Second through Ninth Streets, and the Ohio and Muskingum Rivers.

The National Register includes properties and districts that are considered historic under any of four criteria:
Association with significant events in American history
Association with significant historical individuals
Well-preserved and historically significant architecture
Possibility of yielding archaeological evidence
While most properties and districts on the Register qualify under one or two of the criteria, the Marietta Historic District qualifies under all four.

See also
Basilica of St. Mary of the Assumption (Marietta, Ohio)

References

Historic districts on the National Register of Historic Places in Ohio
National Register of Historic Places in Washington County, Ohio